The Battle of Djerba took place in May 1560 near the island of Djerba, Tunisia. The Ottomans under Piyale Pasha's command overwhelmed a large joint Christian Alliance fleet, composed chiefly of Spanish, Papal, Genoese, Maltese, and Neapolitan forces. The allies lost 27 galleys and some smaller vessels as well as the fortified island of Djerba. This victory marked perhaps the high point of Ottoman power in the Mediterranean Sea.

Until about 1573 the Mediterranean headed the list of Spanish priorities under Philip II of Spain (1556–98); under his leadership the Habsburg galley fleet increased to about 100 ships, and more in wartime. Spain sent a major fleet against the Turks in 1560, aiming for the island of Djerba off the coast west of Tripoli. The Ottoman fleet won a resounding victory, killing more than 10,000 men and sinking many vessels. However, typical of the aftermath of Mediterranean battles, they did not follow up the victory. Spain was able to rebuild its fleet in the next two years and prepared a new offensive in 1563–64 with nearly 100 ships. Despite the Ottomans being victorious in the battle, they were unable to attack the Venetian center of gravity.

Background
Since losing against Barbarossa Hayreddin's Ottoman fleet at the Battle of Preveza in 1538 and the disastrous expedition of Emperor Charles V against Barbarossa in Algiers in 1541, the major European sea powers in the Mediterranean, Spain and Venice, felt more and more threatened by the Ottomans and their corsair allies. Indeed, by 1558 Piyale Pasha had captured the Balearic Islands and together with Turgut Reis raided the Mediterranean coasts of Spain. King Philip II of Spain appealed to Pope Paul IV and his allies in Europe to organize an expedition to retake Tripoli from Turgut Reis, who had captured the city from the Maltese Knights in August 1551 and had subsequently been made Bey (Governor) of Tripoli by Sultan Suleiman the Magnificent.

Forces
The historian William H. Prescott wrote that the sources describing the Djerba campaign were so contradictory it was impossible to reconcile them. Most historians believe that the fleet assembled by the allied Christian powers in 1560 consisted of between 50 and 60 galleys and between 40 and 60 smaller craft. For example, Giacomo Bosio, the official historian of the Knights of St John writes that there were 54 galleys. Fernand Braudel also gives 54 warships plus 36 supply vessels. One of the most detailed accounts is by Carmel Testa who evidently has access to the archives of the Knights of St. John. He lists precisely 54 galleys, 7 brigs, 17 frigates, 2 galleons, 28 merchant vessels, and 12 small ships. These were supplied by a coalition that consisted of Genoa, the Grand Duchy of Tuscany,  the Papal States, and the Knights of S. John. Matthew Carr gives the number of 200 ships for the Christian Alliance. The joint fleet was assembled at Messina under the command of Giovanni Andrea Doria, nephew of the Genoese admiral Andrea Doria. It first sailed to Malta, where bad weather forced it to remain for two months. During this time some 2,000 men were lost to sickness.

On 10 February 1560, the fleet set sail for Tripoli. The precise numbers of soldiers aboard are not known. Braudel gives 10,000-12,000; Testa 14,000; older figures in excess of 20,000 are clearly exaggerations considering the number of men a sixteenth-century galley could carry.

Although the expedition landed not far from Tripoli, the lack of water, sickness and a freak storm caused the commanders to abandon their original objective, and on 7 March they returned to the island of Djerba, which they quickly overran. The Viceroy of Sicily, Juan de la Cerda, 4th Duke of Medinaceli, ordered a fort to be built on the island, and construction was begun. By that time an Ottoman fleet of about 86 galleys and galliots under the command of the Ottoman admiral Piyale Pasha was already underway from Istanbul. Piyale's fleet arrived at Djerba on 11 May 1560, much to the surprise of the Christian forces.

The battle
The battle was over in a matter of hours, with about half the Christian galleys captured or sunk. Anderson gives the total number of Christian casualties as 18,000 but Guilmartin more conservatively puts the losses at about 9,000 of which about two-thirds would have been oarsmen.

The surviving soldiers took refuge in the fort they had completed just days earlier, which was soon attacked by the combined forces of Piyale Pasha and Turgut Reis (who had joined Piyale Pasha on the third day), but not before Giovanni Andrea Doria managed to escape in a small vessel. After a siege of three months, the garrison surrendered and, according to Bosio, Piyale carried about 5,000 prisoners back to Istanbul, including the Spanish commander, D. Alvaro de Sande, who had taken command of the Christian forces after Doria had fled. The accounts of the final days of the besieged garrison are irreconcilable. Ogier de Busbecq, the Austrian Habsburg ambassador to Constantinople, recounts in his famous Turkish Letters that, recognizing the futility of armed resistance, de Sande had tried to escape in a small boat, but was quickly captured. In other accounts, for instance Braudel's, he led a sortie on 29 July and was in that way captured. Through Busbecq's efforts, de Sande was ransomed and released several years later and fought against the Turks at the Siege of Malta in 1565.

Aftermath
The victory in the Battle of Djerba represented the apex of Ottoman naval domination in the Mediterranean, which had been growing since the victory at the Battle of Preveza 22 years earlier.

Of particular importance were the crippling losses of the Spanish fleet in experienced personnel: 600 skilled mariners (oficiales) and 2,400 arquebusier marines were lost, men who could not be quickly replaced.

After Djerba the Maltese channel lay open and it was inevitable that the Ottomans soon turned on the new base of the Knights of St John in Malta in 1565 (the Knights having  previously been expelled from Rhodes in 1522), but did not succeed in taking it.

There is a claim that the victorious Ottomans erected a pyramid of skulls of the defeated Spanish defenders, which stood until the late nineteenth century.  A small monument now stands in its place at Borj Ghazi Mustafa, Homt Souk.

In Literature

The Battle of Djerba is given a prominent place in The Course of Fortune by Tony Rothman (2015), a novel that concerns the events leading to the Great Siege of Malta, 1565.

The Battle of Djerba is featured in Falcon's Shadow: A Novel of the Knights of Malta by Marthese Fenech (2020) the second novel in Fenech's Siege of Malta trilogy.

Notes

References

Sources

Conflicts in 1560
Naval battles involving the Ottoman Empire
Naval battles involving the Knights Hospitaller
Military history of Tunisia
Ottoman–Spanish conflicts
Naval battles involving the Papal States
Battle of Djerba
Djerba
1560 in Africa
1560 in the Ottoman Empire